Asankhan Dzhumakhmatovich Dzhumakhmatov (June 16, 1923 – June 21, 2008) was a Soviet and Kyrgyzstani composer and conductor of the Soviet era, born in Arashan. A member of the Communist Party of the Soviet Union since 1944, he was named a People's Artist of the USSR in 1976. He graduated from the Moscow Conservatory in 1958, and held various posts in the Kirghiz SSR. He also received the Toktogul State Prize of the Kirghiz SSR in 1972.

References
Dzhumakhmatov, Asankhan from the Great Soviet Encyclopedia
Biographical outline

1923 births
2008 deaths
20th-century conductors (music)
20th-century male musicians
People from Chüy Region
People from Semirechye Oblast
Communist Party of the Soviet Union members
Moscow Conservatory alumni
Heroes of the Kyrgyz Republic
People's Artists of the USSR
Recipients of the Order of the Red Banner of Labour
Recipients of the Order of the Red Star
Kyrgyzstani classical musicians
Kyrgyzstani composers
Soviet classical musicians
Soviet conductors (music)
Soviet male composers
Soviet music educators
Burials at Ala-Archa Cemetery